Ihor Brovko (born 13 August 1992) is a professional Ukrainian footballer, who plays as a midfielder.

Brovko is product of different the Kyiv's Youth Sportive Schools. He made his debut for FC Arsenal Kyiv in the Ukrainian Premier League played in the game against FC Metalist Kharkiv on 10 March 2013.

References

External links
Profile at FFU Official Site (Ukr)

1992 births
Living people
Ukrainian footballers
Ukrainian expatriate footballers
FC Arsenal Kyiv players
FC Hoverla Uzhhorod players
FC Arsenal-Kyivshchyna Bila Tserkva players
FC Skala Stryi (2004) players
FC Kolkheti-1913 Poti players
FC Nyva Ternopil players
Ukrainian Premier League players
Association football midfielders
Ukrainian expatriate sportspeople in Georgia (country)
Expatriate footballers in Georgia (country)